Why Women Sin is a 1920 American silent drama film directed by Burton L. King and starring Anna Luther, Charles K. Gerrard and Claire Whitney.

Cast
 Anna Luther as Dorothy Pemberton 
 E.J. Ratcliffe as Philip Pemberton 
 Baby Ivy Ward as Little Grace 
 Claire Whitney as Baroness de Ville
 Charles K. Gerrard as Baron de Ville 
 Al Hart as Horton
 Jack W. Johnston as Captain Morelake

References

Bibliography
 Munden, Kenneth White. The American Film Institute Catalog of Motion Pictures Produced in the United States, Part 1. University of California Press, 1997.

External links
 

1920 films
1920 drama films
1920s English-language films
American silent feature films
Silent American drama films
American black-and-white films
Films directed by Burton L. King
1920s American films